Natalie Marlowe Dillon is a fictional character from the daytime soap opera, All My Children. The role was originated by Kate Collins in 1985. Collins continued as Natalie until August 17, 1992. Melody Anderson replaced Collins when she left the show, appearing from August 24, 1992, until the spring of 1993, when the character was killed off. Collins later reappeared as visions of Natalie in 1997, 1998 and 2001.

Storylines
Natalie Hunter came to Pine Valley as a gold digger, but turned into one of the town's great heroines. During the first part of her stay in Pine Valley, she often schemed and fought with Erica Kane over many different men.

Natalie, originally from Canada, first came to town as a woman who was interested in millionaire Alex Hunter. She fell in love with his son Jeremy, but she couldn't resist the dollar signs she saw in Alex. So Alex and Natalie married in a wonderful church wedding. But an affair soon began between Jeremy and Natalie and Alex found out. He told Natalie to get out of his life and disowned Jeremy but before he could change his will, Alex was killed in a horse riding accident. Natalie was left a wealthy widow and soon she and Jeremy were free to have a relationship. But Jeremy had moved on to Erica Kane and Natalie wasn't ready to let him go. She drugged him and slept with him, but the next day he walked away. When she learned she was pregnant, she told Jeremy, who promptly married her in May 1986.

But happiness between Jeremy and Natalie wasn't to be. When Jeremy was arrested for stock trading, it was Erica who broke him out of prison. Natalie, Erica, and Jeremy found themselves all on the same plane for New York. When the plane engines exploded and the plane crashed, Jeremy saved both women and they all were stranded on an island. Here Natalie gave birth to a son, Timmy. Soon after the truth came out that Timmy was Alex's son and not Jeremy's, Jeremy tossed his wife out of the Hunter Mansion and filed for divorce. But Natalie refused to sign the divorce papers and tried to blackmail him into staying in the marriage. But she finally realized Jeremy was in love with Erica and not her and never would be, she signed the papers and the divorce went through.

In July 1987, Natalie was hired as a nurse by Palmer Cortlandt, after he was shot. Palmer and Natalie eventually fell in love and planned to marry, but Ross Chandler, Palmer's son, with whom Natalie had an affair, got in the way. Natalie eventually chose Palmer. Enraged at this rejection, Ross raped Natalie. Palmer then kicked Ross out of his house and he and Natalie eventually married. But soon after, Palmer's selfish ways led her astray and the marriage began to collapse. When Silver Kane tried to blackmail Natalie with incriminating information, Natalie refused to budge. Silver attempted to kill her, but Natalie in self-defense shot her to death in January 1988. Palmer helped her cover the murder but both were found out. When Silver’s body was discovered, Natalie went to trial. When Palmer was implicated as an accomplice, he was sent to prison for obstruction of justice.

Out of prison, Natalie re-sparked her affair with Jeremy. With Jeremy's help, Natalie got off her charges for murder and she and Jeremy planned to get married again. When Natalie served Palmer the divorce papers he was crushed. Palmer, now out of prison, tried to hang onto his wife as he truly loved her. In summer 1988, he used Marissa Rampal to break up Jeremy and Natalie. But even this was not enough to keep the couple apart and Natalie finalized her divorce from Palmer in November 1988 and proclaimed her love for Jeremy.

But horrifically, in mid-1990, Jeremy met and began a secret relationship with another woman Ceara Connor. When Natalie found out, she was heartbroken and planned to leave town with Timmy and start over. Then she met Trevor Dillon, a rough around the edges but good-hearted police officer. After some initial friction, they bonded and Trevor grew fond of Timmy. The couple began to date and Trevor fell for "Doll" as he affectionately called her. But Natalie, still hurt over being rejected by Jeremy twice, couldn't commit. As a result, she began working for Adam Chandler, Palmer's rival, and soon she found herself engaged to Adam and married Adam in March 1991 for business reasons. But it was clear she was in love with Trevor and finally after learning about Adams corrupt ways she divorced him and moved on to Trevor. When Natalie inherited $10 million she started a foundation and Trevor asked Natalie to marry her and she accepted.

Natalie was finally happy; she was engaged to be married to Trevor Dillon, but then her psychotic younger sister, Janet Green, came to Pine Valley. Janet had always been jealous of Natalie and plotted to take over Natalie's life. She set her revenge plan into motion and imprisoned Natalie down a well. Janet married Trevor while posing as Natalie and became pregnant. Janet was later exposed and sent to jail. Trevor and Natalie finally made it to the altar and married on July 18, 1992. Trevor adopted Natalie's son Timmy, and Natalie adopted Trevor and Janet's daughter, Amanda.

During this time, Natalie befriended assistant district attorney Galen Henderson. Galen was being terrorized by ex-husband Carter Jones, newly released from prison after serving a sentence for spousal abuse. Trevor was determined to catch Carter in the act. Carter responded by setting the Dillon house on fire. He intended it as a warning, not knowing Natalie and Amanda would be trapped in the blaze. Trevor rescued both his wife and daughter. While hospitalized, Natalie (now played by Anderson) lashed out at Trevor and bonded with Kyle, a hospital orderly. Kyle was actually Carter, who soon grew obsessed with Natalie. He ended up kidnapping her before they fell overboard from his houseboat during a confrontation with Trevor, who jumped into the water after them. While Natalie and Trevor emerged from the water, Carter soon surfaced in nearby Corinth, before being apprehended and sent back to prison. Natalie, meanwhile, was healed of her blindness at Christmas.

In early 1993, Natalie met a mysterious woman named Laurel Banning. She and Laurel became close friends but Trevor was suspicious of her. This put a strain on the marriage. When Trevor began an investigation he learned that Laurel was an embezzler and prepared to arrest his wife's best friend. When he told Natalie, she refused to believe him and they had a huge argument. In the end, Natalie ran out on Trevor and left for Erica's wedding to Dimitri. At the wedding, Natalie learned from her ex-husband Adam that Laurel had been manipulating him as well. Natalie was horrified that Trevor was right all along, and Adam and Natalie took off after her. But along the way, Natalie (who was driving) lost control of the car and ran off the road. Adam was left paralyzed and Natalie was rushed to Pine Valley Hospital.

Despite prayers for her and tons of medical help, Natalie was left comatose. She had severe brain damage. Trevor was even more distressed to learn that Laurel was nowhere to be found. After days of prayers and hope, Natalie was declared brain dead in the ER on June 30, 1993. Heartbroken, Trevor signed the papers to remove her from life support and Trevor, Timmy, and Amanda together as a family dealt with the death of the beloved Natalie.

In December 1997, Tim had fallen into sad shape since his mother's death. He had been trying to sabotage Trevor's relationship with Janet, who was not only emotionally stable for the first time in her life, but also free from prison and in a relationship with Trevor, who had fallen in love with her. When his ploys were found out, Tim ran away from home and along the way got attacked by thugs. A mysterious woman saved Tim's life and told him that running away would solve nothing. Tim was shocked when he realized this mystery woman was Natalie, now a glorious guardian angel. Tim took his mother's advice and gave Janet a chance. He did so and eventually grew to love Janet as much as he loved Natalie.

In May 1998, Natalie again returned to Earth as an angel when Janet was refusing to marry Trevor because she didn't want to dishonor Natalie. Natalie gave Janet her blessing and Janet and Trevor happily wed. In October, Natalie's dog Harold died of cancer and Natalie once again returned to Earth to fetch her puppy and escort her canine friend into the afterlife.

In June 2001, Gillian Andrassy was shot and killed by a mad gunwoman. Natalie, along with now dead ex-husband, Jeremy Hunter, Jesse Hubbard, Cindy Chandler, Harold and Travis Montgomery, helped Gillian accept her death and grow used to life in Heaven.

References

External links 
 Natalie Marlowe's Bio at soapcentral.com

All My Children characters
Fictional nurses
Fictional philanthropists
Female characters in television
Fictional Canadian people
Fictional characters from Pennsylvania
Television characters introduced in 1985
Fictional ghosts